Jyoshna (Joanne La Trobe) aka Jyosna, Joshna, Jyotsna, is a British born  New Zealander Kirtan singer/songwriter and ethnomusicologist  Her stage name comes from Sanskrit and the meaning is "moonlight".

Biography

Joanne La Trobe, stage name Jyoshna was born in England, 11 August 1956 into a musical family, her parent are named Leslie Essex La Trobe and Toni La Trobe (aka Isobel Burton). The family migrated to Australia then to New Zealand in 1963, which became their home. Jyoshna began composing at an early age and was performing with her band "The Livewires", at Greenmeadows Intermediate School, Manurewa. Her second band was Turiiya which included Daryn Long (aka Diipali Linwood) and Kim Wesney who performed, composed and recorded together between 1983 and 1990. Since then Jyoshna has gone on as a solo artist and recorded many stunning albums.
Jyoshna is always looking for new ways to express and explore music and spirituality from both western and eastern prospective, fusing sounds of traditional Indian music with western sensibility, Taonga Puoro and singer/songwriter styles.
 
Jyoshna's music has taken her to many countries of the world and at each place she has collaborated with local musicians: in India with the Mahato Kiirtan group and the Rarhi Chhau dance musicians; in London with the RAWA group; in Vermont USA with local musicians Tina Tourin and friends and in Brazil with Matrika (Cecilia Valentim, Sergio Leone, and Ramon Soza and friends). Her music has featured on Brazilian TV, NRK Norwegian and NZ TV. As an original composer, Jyoshna has authored many albums of both her own, as well as ethnographic material, including Red Earth Song (1996), Magnificence (2001) and Unity Hours I (2008), Unity Hours II (2010), Unity Hours III (2019), Unity Hours (2022). Jyoshna has composed music for the New Zealand feature film Stars in Her Eyes (2016, Dir. by Athina Tsoulis) and completed a new album called Dharma Cakra, Sanskrit songs for Meditation. Jyoshna is presently working as an itinerant lecturer, music teacher and composer at Bethells Beach in Auckland. Her other passion is ethnomusicology, and in 2010 she completed her PhD in music, at the School of Oriental and African Studies (SOAS), University of London on "Marai Kirtan and the Performance of Ecstasy in the Purulia District of West Bengal, India".

Jyoshna's research focuses on the 'praise music of West Bengal (Rarh), India, as well as Maori and indigenous people's music. She also has her own collection of audio visual material housed at the World Music Archives, British Library (C1211).

Kirtan
As a musician and ethnomusicologist of eastern devotional singing, kirtan plays a major role in La Trobe's musical and academic career. Many of her music compositions are pada kirtan or 'devotional songs' and nama kirtan or "chanting the name of God". Her research into the background of kirtan led her to Rarh, India, the homeland of the Giita Govinda by Jayadeva (11th century) where she spent 2005–2010 documenting the traditional kirtan performances. Her own kirtan compositions are a blend of western singer/songwriter genres and Rarh devotional music.

Rarhology
Dr Jyoshna La Trobe's pioneering research work on the music culture of Rarh (1996–2010) is documented in her Masters Thesis Red Earth: the Music Culture of Rarh (University of Auckland) and her PhD Red Earth Song: marai kirtan and the performance of Ecstasy at the School of Oriental and African Studies (SOAS), London. Over 120 hours of audio visual material is deposited in the British Library World music Sound Archives in her catalogue called the La Trobe Rarhi Music Collection. Music genres of Rarh covered in the PhD include: jhumur 'folk songs', Baul 'mystic songs', nacini nach 'dancing girls dance' and the Chhau 'masked martial dance of the ancient warrior' as well as a musical analysis and transcriptions of marai kirtan 'praise music' performance. Video footage also includes Prabhat Samgiita ('songs of the new dawn'), composed by P. R. Sarkar.

Selected discography

Solo albums
2014   Dharma Cakra, HPMGL Studio, Auckland, NZ, Innersong USA 
2012	Live in Brazil, Innersong USA
2010	Unity Hours II, Sky Studios, London, Innersong USA  
2007 Red Earth Fusion, Innersong, USA 
2006	Unity Hours I, Sky TV Studio, London, Innersong USA
2004 Reddish Blossom, songs inspired by Prabhat Samgiit, Bengali love songs, Innersong, USA  
2001 	Era Dynamic,* MoreFm Studios, Auckland, NZ, Innersong USA
2001   Magnificence, Outback Studio, Auckland, INnersong USA.
1999 Dancing Divinity, Acoustic Wave, Auckland, NZ, Innersong USA.
1997	Longing,* Q Studio, More Fm Studios Auckland, and Q Studios, Australia, Innersong USA
1996 Sounds of Silence,* More Fm Studio, Auckland, NZ, Innersong, USA  
1993	Touched by the Sea,* Innersong, USA.
1993	Beloved, Innersong, USA.
1991 Reign of Love, Acoustic Wave Records, Auckland, NZ.

Group albums
2002	Lotus Beat, with EastranzWest, Visitors Records, NZ.
1989	Waiting – the Album with Turiiya, Jayrem Records, Wellington, NZ
1987   Daughters of the Flame, Harlequin Studios, Auckland, NZ 8
1986 with From Scratch – Pacific 3,2,1,Zero Part 1 and 2 Live, with Philip Dadson, Don McGlashan

* kiirtan recordings

Selected publications
Articles

1997 "Red Earth – The Music Culture of Rarh, India". Unpublished MA, University of Auckland.  
2000 Probe Magazine, Issue 2. Ancient patterns and Contemporary Expressions, Manukau Institute of Technology, Art SchoolPress, Auckland. Pg 16–21.
2010 Gurukul Network Issue 31, "The Supra-aesthetic Science of Kiirtan", pg. 16–20. 
2010 "Marai kirtan and the performance of ecstasy in Purulia", West Bengal, India. Unpublished PhD.

References and selected reviews

Uniao TV Channel, Presentation/live and studio concert of her music with over a million viewers, Brasília, Brazil, 12 August 2011.
NRK1 Television, Perspectiv, Norwegian TV Documentary on her music in London, April and November 2010.   
Robert Allen, "Unity Hours Review", The Rock Society, June/July 2008.   
NRK TV Norwegian TV Documentary, Perspectiv, Nov 2006.  
Graham Reid, "Magnificence by Joshna", New Zealand Herald, 10 March 2001
Nick Bollinger "Joshna, Magnificence", NZ Listener, 10 February 2001, p. 35
Jennifer Shennan "Leaping Lizards", Listener, 21 April 2001 p. 55

External links
 

1956 births
Living people
Place of birth missing (living people)
English women singer-songwriters
Alumni of SOAS University of London
Kirtan performers
English emigrants to New Zealand